1250, boulevard René-Lévesque is a , 47-storey skyscraper in Montreal, Quebec, Canada. It is the tallest building in Montreal as well as the tallest building in Quebec. 
The building was designed by Kohn Pedersen Fox Associates for IBM Canada and Marathon Realty, hence the former name "IBM-Marathon Tower". It is now named for its address at 1250 René Lévesque Boulevard West, in the Ville-Marie borough of Downtown Montreal. It is adjacent to the Bell Centre and Windsor Station to the south, and stands on the site of the former American Presbyterian Church. It is connected to the Bonaventure metro station and the underground city network.

1250 is currently owned and managed by global real estate investor, developer and owner BentallGreenOak.

Architecture

1250 René-Lévesque's architecture is based on another skyscraper by Kohn Pedersen Fox, the 51-story Westend Tower in Frankfurt, Germany. The design is partly dictated by the building's position at the former western edge of the downtown core, with its shape forming a boundary between the commercial center and the historically residential periphery (though since the building's construction the downtown area has advanced southwestward). As such it has a markedly rectangular footprint, being very elongated on a north-south axis. Like its Frankfurt counterpart, emphasis is given to the east and west façades, which have opposed yet complementary appearances that strongly relate to the urban area they face. 
The modern-style western façade, facing the historically low-rise residential periphery, is a straight granite-clad wall covered with square windows, with irregular setbacks creating the appearance of several superimposed slabs. Conversely the postmodern-style eastern façade, facing the commercial center, is dominated by an outwardly-curved glass curtain wall that extends past the southern edge, creating a suspended vertical "fin" that emphasizes the structure's impression of lightness and thrust. The narrow north wall recesses in a series of setbacks, allowing the building to keep its human scale at street level. At the lowest setback, the 4-floor atrium includes a bamboo-planted winter garden, and a food court on a mezzanine. At the building top, a spire/antenna is integrated to the north walls of the last few floors and extends 31 metres beyond the mechanical penthouse above the 47th floor.

Montreal's downtown area is now expanding southwest of the building (that formally was an unofficial downtown "boundary"), with the two towers of the  Cité du commerce électronique in the west. The height of those towers increases towards the 1250 and the city center, creating a "staircase effect" in the skyline.

Tenants
Air Liquide Canada
Bayer
BMO Harris Bank
Canaccord Financial Inc
Chubb Corp.
CIBC Wood Gundy
Credit Suisse
Deutsche Bank
EquiSoft Inc. 
International Cospas-Sarsat Programme
Langlois Lawyers LLP
LASIK MD
Lazard
Macquarie Group
McKinsey & Company
Merrill Lynch Canada
Michael Page International
PSP Investments
PricewaterhouseCoopers
Richardson GMP Limited
Wells Fargo Equipment Finance

See also
 List of tallest buildings in Montreal

References

External links

 Oxford Properties datasheet 
 Kohn Pedersen Fox datasheet

Skyscrapers in Montreal
IBM facilities
Kohn Pedersen Fox buildings
Office buildings completed in 1992
Skyscraper office buildings in Canada
Downtown Montreal
Oxford Properties